The  (French) or  (Dutch) is a square in Brussels, Belgium. It was created following the covering of the river Senne (1867–1871). It is named in honour of André-Napoléon Fontainas, a former mayor of the City of Brussels.

The square lies at the conjunction of the Boulevard Anspach/Anspachlaan to the north with the / to the south, in the Midi–Lemonnier or Stalingrad Quarter (southern part of the City of Brussels). It is served by the premetro (underground tram) station Anneessens on lines 3 and 4.

History

Early history

The Place Fontainas was laid out following the covering of the river Senne (1867–1871), as part of the major urban works by the architect Léon Suys under the tenure of the then-mayor of the City of Brussels, Jules Anspach.

Located at the junction of the Boulevard Anspach/Anspachlaan (then called the /) and the /, the square occupies the site of the former Small Island formed by two arms of the Senne, an old link between the / and the /. The bent end of the latter now forms the western side of the square.

In his 1865 project, Suys planned to erect a monumental fountain on the square, which was to break the monotony of the boulevards, but it was abandoned for budgetary reasons. Since 1871, the square has borne the name of the liberal politician and former mayor of the City of Brussels André-Napoléon Fontainas.

1970s to present
Due to the presence of gay bars on and around the Rue du Marché au Charbon, the Place Fontanais became the centre of gay prostitution in Brussels from the early 1970s. Men from all walks of life came there to pick up often young prostitutes (between 14 and 25 years old). After the police ended a prostitution network with Macedonian children aged 12 to 14 in 1995–96, gay prostitution in the square no longer caused any particular problems.

Since its creation in the 19th century, the square has often changed appearance. Nevertheless, it retains a large number of fin de siècle buildings. Since 29 June 2015, it has been part of a large pedestrian zone in central Brussels. On that occasion, it was partially restored to its original appearance and was repaved. Decorated with plantations and equipped with numerous benches, it once again constitutes a pleasant space.

See also

 Neoclassical architecture in Belgium
 History of Brussels
 Belgium in "the long nineteenth century"

References

Notes

Bibliography
 
 
 
 

Squares in Brussels
City of Brussels
19th century in Brussels
Car-free zones in Europe